Farm Home was a newspaper published monthly in Springfield, Illinois. The articles it published focused largely on livestock production, farming, child-rearing, and household advice. Along with economic sections, there were also personal anecdotes, opinions, and advertisements.

References

External links
Illinois Digital Newspaper Collections: Farm Home (1899-1920)

Newspapers published in Illinois